Dhareru is a village in Bhiwani Tehsil in the Bhiwani district of the Indian state of Haryana. Its primary post office is Dhareu.

Demographics

Dhareru has a population of 8,425  and 1200 households. Males (4548) constitute 53.83%  of the population and females (3877) 46.16%. Dhareru  has an average literacy rate of 68%, which is lower than the national average of 74%; male literacy is 76% and female literacy is 47% of total literates. In Dhareru, 16% of the population is under 6 years of age.

Adjacent villages
Nangal (3 km)
Badala (3 km)
Manheru (3 km)
Kayla (4 km)
Sanga (3 km) are the nearby Villages to Dhareru.
Umrawat (6 km) Near to bhiwani
Kasni (8 km)

Adjacent cities
Bhiwani
Charkhi Dadri
Rohtak
Jhajjar

The famous personality of this village is Mr. Praveen Kaushik who is the first Income Tax Inspector born in this village. He secured this Post in the batch 2015 and currently serving in the cadre of Karnataka and Goa region. His father Mr. Jaibhagwan is farmer and mother a hardworking house wife.

References

External links 
Official website of Bhiwani district

Villages in Bhiwani district